Sally Achey is a former American politician from Vermont. She was a member of the 2021-2023  Vermont House of Representatives - defeating Robin Chesnut-Tangerman in the 2020 general election by a slim 32 votes. Achey, concerned about the fiscal cost of the VT Global Warming Solutions Act, ran against Chesnut-Tangerman again in 2022 and lost 962 to 855.

References

External links 

 Official website

Living people
21st-century American politicians
21st-century American women politicians
People from Middletown Springs, Vermont
American people of Welsh descent
University of Vermont alumni
Republican Party members of the Vermont House of Representatives
Women state legislators in Vermont
Year of birth missing (living people)